The 2016 Individual Speedway Australian Championship is a Motorcycle speedway competition organised by Motorcycling Australia (MA) for the Australian Solo Championship.

The four round series were held between 2 January and 10 January.

The rounds were held at the Loxford Park Speedway in Kurri Kurri on 2 January, Undera Park Speedway in Undera on 6 January, Gillman Speedway in Adelaide on 8 January, with the fourth and final round to be held at the Olympic Park Speedway in Mildura on 10 January.

Qualification
Nine riders were originally seeded to the four round series by Motorcycling Australia. They were:
 Troy Batchelor (SA)
 Mason Campton (NSW)
 Max Fricke (Vic)
 Josh Grajczonek (Qld)
 Sam Masters (NSW)
 Nick Morris (Qld)
 Tyron Proctor (Vic)
 Justin Sedgmen (Vic)
 Rohan Tungate (NSW)

Unfortunately, 2013 national champion and former Speedway Grand Prix rider Troy Batchelor was forced to withdraw before the series got under way. Brady Kurtz won the qualifying round held on New Year's Day at Loxford Park after being tied on 12 points with Jordan Stewart. Jack Holder finished third on 11 points. Also qualifying for the series was Kieran Sproule, Brodie Waters, Alan McDonald, Josh Pickering and Cooper Riordan.

Loxford Park
 Round one
 2 January
  Kurri Kurri, New South Wales - Loxford Park Speedway
 Referee: Gavin Willson
 Top 3 riders to "A" Final, riders 4-7 to "B" Final
 "B" Final winner to "A" Final

Loxford Park "B" Final
1 - Brady Kurtz
2 - Jack Holder
3 - Justin Sedgmen
4 - Mason Campton

Loxford Park "A" Final
1 - Rohan Tungate
2 - Sam Masters
3 - Max Fricke
4 - Brady Kurtz

Undera Park
 Round two
 6 January
  Undera, Victoria - Undera Park Speedway
 Referee: Gavin Willson
 Top 3 riders to "A" Final, riders 4-7 to "B" Final
 "B" Final winner to "A" Final

Undera Park "B" Final
1 - Sam Masters
2 - Max Fricke
3 - Jack Holder
4 - Brodie Waters

Undera Park "A" Final
1 - Nick Morris
2 - Mason Campton
3 - Sam Masters
X - Brady Kurtz

Gillman
 Round three
 8 January
  Adelaide, South Australia - Gillman Speedway
 Referee: Gavin Willson
 Top 3 riders to "A" Final, riders 4-7 to "B" Final
 "B" Final winner to "A" Final

Gillman "B" Final
1 - Sam Masters
2 - Nick Morris
3 - Jack Holder
4 - Max Fricke

Gillman "A" Final
1 - Brady Kurtz
2 - Rohan Tungate
3 - Justin Sedgmen
4 - Sam Masters

Olympic Park
 Round four
 10 January
  Mildura, Victoria - Olympic Park Speedway
 Referee: Gavin Willson
 Top 3 riders to "A" Final, riders 4-7 to "B" Final
 "B" Final winner to "A" Final

Olympic Park "B" Final
1 - Brady Kurtz
2 - Nick Morris
3 - Jack Holder
fx - Rohan Tungate

Olympic Park "A" Final
1 - Justin Sedgmen
2 - Max Fricke
3 - Sam Masters
X - Brady Kurtz

Intermediate classification

References

See also
 Australian Individual Speedway Championship
 Australia national speedway team
 Sports in Australia

Australia
Speedway in Australia